Westmont is a station on Metra's BNSF Line in Westmont, Illinois. In Metra's zone-based fare system, Westmont is in zone D. As of 2018, Westmont is the 44th busiest of Metra's 236 non-downtown stations, with an average of 1,083 weekday boardings. There is a staffed station building across the street from the Westmont Village Hall. The station house is diagonally across from the Village Hall at West Quincy and South Lincoln Streets.

Bus connections
Pace

 715 Central DuPage

References

External links 

Station from Cass Avenue from Google Maps Street View

Metra stations in Illinois
Former Chicago, Burlington and Quincy Railroad stations
Westmont, Illinois
Railway stations in DuPage County, Illinois